17th Street Plaza is a 438 ft (134 m) tall skyscraper in Denver, Colorado. It was completed in 1982 and has 33 floors, with a total area of 695,000-square-feet. It was designed by Skidmore, Owings & Merrill and Wendel Duchsherer Architects. It is currently (2012) the 11th tallest building in Denver. 

In 2009 the building was bought from J.P. Morgan for an estimated $135 million by HRPT Properties Trust. The building was reported to be 93 percent leased, with occupants including Molson Coors, KPMG, Marsh & McLennan, Consulate General of Japan , and the Macquarie Group. In 2019, Plant Holdings North America, Inc. purchased the property.

See also
List of tallest buildings in Denver

References

External links
https://17thstreetplaza.com/toc.cfm Building web site]

Skyscraper office buildings in Denver
1982 establishments in Colorado
Skidmore, Owings & Merrill buildings
Office buildings completed in 1982
Leadership in Energy and Environmental Design gold certified buildings